The United Workers Movement-NMI is an organization in the Commonwealth of the Northern Mariana Islands devoted to fighting for workers rights in the CNMI and helping workers improve their status.

They are currently involved in rallies and activities focused on ensuring that legal alien workers have legal status after November 28, 2009 when the US federal government takes over immigration and labor in the CNMI.

References
May Day ralliers demand better immigration status
 
United Workers Movement supports Doromal’s letter writing campaign

Syed elected United Workers Movement president

Thousands of Pinoys on Saipan Island line up for Guam jobs

Mariana Islands governor sues to stop application of US immigration system 

Trade unions in the United States
Workers' rights organizations based in the United States
State wide trade unions in the United States
Organizations based in the Northern Mariana Islands
Economy of the Northern Mariana Islands